Halle Messe is a railway station located in Halle (Saale), Germany. The station is located on the Magdeburg-Leipzig railway. The train services are operated by Deutsche Bahn. Since December 2013 the station is served by the S-Bahn Mitteldeutschland.

Train services
The following services currently call at the station:

References

Railway stations in Halle (Saale)